The Communal Council is the body responsible for the civil administration of the four quartiers of the Principality of Monaco. Because Monaco is both a nation and a city, the council chooses the mayor of Monaco and his/her officers. It consists of fifteen members, elected by direct universal suffrage to four-year terms, and a mayor, selected by the members. It meets every three months. The main responsibilities of the City Council and the Mayor concern the social and cultural spheres. These responsibilities include support for daycares, home care for seniors, and the Academy of music, as well as organization of elections, granting of marriage licenses, and encouraging engagement in the life of the city.

See also 
 Municipality of Monaco

References 

Politics of Monaco
Political organisations based in Monaco
Government of Monaco